Sara-Thel Court is a bungalow court located at 618-630 S. Marengo Ave. in Pasadena, California. The court includes seven buildings arranged around a central walkway; six of the buildings are single-family units, while a double unit is located at the end of the walkway. Built in 1921, the court was designed by Jas. Humphreys. The houses were mainly designed in the American Craftsman style and feature gable roofs with shallow slopes and exposed rafters; the moldings on the homes were inspired by the Colonial Revival style.

References

External links

Bungalow courts
Bungalow architecture in California
Houses in Pasadena, California
Houses completed in 1921
Houses on the National Register of Historic Places in California
National Register of Historic Places in Pasadena, California
American Craftsman architecture in California
Colonial Revival architecture in California